A drug is any chemical substance other than a food or device that affects the function of living things.

Drug(s) or D.R.U.G.S. may also refer to:

Places 
 Drug or Durg, a city in India
 Drug Island, Alaska, U.S.

Arts, entertainment and media

Music

Groups and production teams
 DRUGS, a funk musical group founded by Michael "Clip" Payne
 D.R.U.G.S. (production team), Directing Reality Undermining Governed Systems
 Destroy Rebuild Until God Shows, an American post-hardcore band previously known as D.R.U.G.S.

Albums and mixtapes
D.R.U.G.S. (album), 2011 album by Destroy Rebuild Until God Shows
 D.R.U.G.S. (Death and Reincarnation Under God's Supervision), 2012 mixtape by Flatbush Zombies

Songs
"Drug", a 2011 song by White Denim from D
"Drugs", 1979 song by Talking Heads from Fear of Music
"D.R.U.G.S.", 2000 song by Phife Dawg from Ventilation: Da LP
"D.R.U.G.S.", 2000 song by Fiend from Can I Burn?
"D.R.U.G.S.", 2009 song by Dead and Divine from The Machines We Are
"D.R.U.G.S.", 2009 song by The Raveonettes from In and Out of Control
"D.R.U.G.S.", 2011 song by Iggy Azalea
"D.R.U.G.S.", 2016 song by Ab-Soul from Do What Thou Wilt.
"Drugs", 2017 song by Charli XCX from Number 1 Angel
”Drugs”, 2019 song by Falling In Reverse

Other arts, entertainment, and media
 Drûg, a term for a member of the Drúedain, a Middle-earth race in the fiction of J. R. R. Tolkien
 Drugs (journal), a peer-reviewed medical journal

Grapes
 Graciano, or Drug, a wine grape

See also
 Antiretroviral drug
 Antiviral drug
 Approved drug, drug approval by the Food and Drug Administration in the United States
 Drug abuse
 Hard and soft drugs
 Illegal drug trade
 Inverse benefit law
 List of drugs
 Misuse of Drugs Act 1971, the United Kingdom act under which substances defined as drugs are listed and controlled
 Performance-enhancing drug
 Pharmaceutical drug
 Psychoactive drug, chemical substance used to alter behavior and perception for many differing reasons
 Recreational drug use